Peter Harboe Frimann or P.H. Frimann (18 November 1752 in Selja præstegård, Norway - 21 September 1839) was a Norwegian-Danish poet.  In 1769 he was a student in Bergen. Later, while a student in Copenhagen, he was a member of The Norwegian Society (‘’Det Norske Selskab’’).

Norwegian male poets
Danish male poets
18th-century Norwegian poets
19th-century Norwegian poets
1752 births
1839 deaths